Marcus Vinícius da Silva Bernardo, best known by his nickname Marcus Baby, is a Brazilian plastic artist. In the 1990s, he decided to create his sculptures using child dolls and action figures (such as Barbie) as a base.

In November 2005, he began creating dolls in the likeness of celebrities. His first work to attract significant media attention was a doll of Alinne Moraes' character in Viver a Vida, a Brazilian telenovela. He also gained media attention when he refused to sell a doll he had created in the likeness of Hebe Camargo.

His doll of Dilma Rousseff, the President of Brazil, was released right after her January 2011 inauguration. Affectionately dubbed "Barbie Dilma," it has become the best-known of his dolls.

References

Living people
1969 births